Gözübüyük may refer to:

 Gözübüyük, Alanya, village in Antalya Province, Turkey
 Gözübüyük, Gündoğmuş, village in Antalya Province, Turkey
 Gözübüyük, Laçin
 Serdar Gözübüyük, Dutch football referee of Turkish descent
 Tarkan Gözübüyük, Turkish musician

Turkish-language surnames